Sucking the 70's – Back in the Saddle is a follow-up album to the 2002 compilation Sucking the 70's. It was released in 2006 by Small Stone Records. Like the original, it features stoner rock bands covering songs from the 1970s.

Track listing

Disc 1
"Are You Ready" - Sasquatch (originally performed by Grand Funk Railroad)
"Crazy Horses" - Puny Human (originally performed by The Osmonds)
"Red Hot Mama" - Clutch & Five Horse Johnson (originally performed by Funkadelic)
"Rock Candy" - Dixie Witch (originally performed by Montrose)
"Don't Lie to Me" - The Brought Low (originally performed by Big Star)
"Sin City" - Novadriver (originally performed by AC/DC)
"One Way or Another" - Colour Haze (originally performed by Cactus)
"Man on the Silver Mountain" - Alabama Thunderpussy (originally performed by Rainbow)
"Mongoloid" - Dozer (originally performed by Devo)
"The Stake" - Acid King (originally performed by Steve Miller Band)
"Honky Cat" - Halfway to Gone (originally performed by Elton John)
"Those Shoes" - Antler (originally performed by The Eagles)
"Outlaw Man" - Brad Davis (Fu Manchu) (originally performed by The Eagles)
"Season of the Witch" - Gideon Smith & the Dixie Damned (originally performed by Donovan)
"Runnin' With the Devil" - Whitey Morgan and the Waycross Georgia Farmboys (originally performed by Van Halen)

Disc 2
"I Just Wanna Make Love to You" - Throttlerod (originally performed by Muddy Waters, covered by many 1970s bands)
"Saturday Night Special" - Red Giant (originally performed by Lynyrd Skynyrd)
"Bonie Moronie" - A Thousand Knives of Fire (originally performed by Ritchie Valens)
"Rock 'n' Roll Singer" - The Glasspack (originally performed by AC/DC)
"When the Levee Breaks" - Roadsaw (originally performed by Kansas Joe McCoy & Memphis Minnie & covered by Led Zeppelin)
"Super Stupid" - Greatdayforup (originally performed by Funkadelic)
"Turn to Stone" - Fireball Ministry (originally performed by Joe Walsh)
"Born to Be Wild" - Los Natas (originally performed by Steppenwolf)
"Two of Us" - Scott Reeder (originally performed by The Beatles)
"New Rose" - Orange Goblin (originally performed by The Damned)
"Garden Road" - Mos Generator (originally performed by Rush)
"Snortin' Whiskey" - Honky (originally performed by Pat Travers)
"I Don't Need No Doctor" - The Muggs (originally performed by Ray Charles & covered by Humble Pie)
"Neighbor, Neighbor" - Amplified Heat (originally performed by ZZ Top)
"Parchment Farm" - RPG (originally performed by Bukka White, covered by many 1970s bands)
"Dreamweaver" - Valis (originally performed by Gary Wright)

References

Sucking the 70's at stonerrock.com

2006 compilation albums